Cinco Paul and Ken Daurio are American screenwriters. They are primarily known for writing screenplays for animated films, including Dr. Seuss' Horton Hears a Who, Despicable Me, Dr. Seuss' The Lorax, Despicable Me 2, The Secret Life of Pets and Despicable Me 3. Paul is also the creator, executive producer and songwriter for the 2021 Apple TV+ musical comedy series Schmigadoon!.

Life and career

Paul
Paul was named after Cinco de Mayo, a celebration held on his birthday. After graduating from Yale University, Paul served a mission for the Church of Jesus Christ of Latter-day Saints in Tokyo. Shortly after returning from his mission he married his girlfriend whom he had met at Yale and to whom he was engaged just before leaving on his mission.  He then won a short film competition and received a fellowship at the USC School of Cinematic Arts, where he graduated in 1993 from the Graduate Screenwriting Program. 
The following year, he sold his first screenplay to Columbia Pictures.

Daurio
Daurio started making films with a Super 8 camera at age 9. After high school, he began directing music videos and directed more than 100 videos.

Collaboration
Paul and Daurio have been collaborating since 1999. They met when Paul wrote a musical for the Church of Jesus Christ of Latter-day Saints' 150-year celebration of the pioneers' arrival in Utah, in which Daurio had one of the leads.

Hitting it off, having similar senses of humor, they formed a band called the Otter Pops, playing at local outdoor malls. Within a year they sold their first script, and a year later their second script, Bubble Boy, was made into a film, which was a critical and commercial failure. To get noticed, they used to sing story pitches to film producers. Although not always successful, this strategy resulted in several produced films, including Bubble Boy and College Road Trip (2008).

They were personally chosen by Audrey Geisel, the widow of Dr. Seuss, to write a computer-animated feature film adaptation of Horton Hears a Who! for Blue Sky Studios via 20th Century Fox Animation, led by Chris Meledandri. In 2007, when Meledandri founded a film production company named Illumination Entertainment, Paul and Daurio followed him.

At Illumination, they wrote screenplays for the highly-successful animated film Despicable Me and its sequel, Despicable Me 2. They also wrote for Illumination's other films, the live action/animated Easter-themed Hop and  adapted another Dr. Seuss book into a computer-animated film, The Lorax. Although Paul and Daurio are screenwriting partners, they prefer to work independently. They divide up scenes and read pages to each other, trying to make each other laugh.

Paul, having an education in screenwriting, generally works on scenes that contain emotion and require the three-act structure, while Daurio, being a more visually oriented person, usually does scenes with action, sight gags and physical comedy. Both being members of The Church of Jesus Christ of Latter-day Saints, their beliefs have had significant impact on their careers. They prefer "to write movies that are uplifting, optimistic and for everybody," while avoiding being "preachy."

The pair adapted Bubble Boy into a stage musical featuring original songs, for which an original cast recording was released on Sh-K-Boom Records in 2017 produced by Paul, Justin Goldner & Kurt Deutsch. Paul is also developing an original musical, A.D. 16, with playwright Bekah Brunstetter centered on the relationship between teenage Jesus Christ and Mary Magdalene. On January 29, 2018, Paul and Daurio were hired to a film adaptation of Birthright for Universal Pictures and Skybound Entertainment.

Paul will be making his feature directorial debut with the live-action animation film Winter Wonderland and will also write original songs for the project.

Filmography

Bubble Boy (2001) - screenwriters
The Santa Clause 2 (2002) - screenplay
Horton Hears a Who! (2008) - screenwriters
College Road Trip (2008) - screenwriters
Despicable Me (2010) - screenplay
Hop (2011) - story and screenplay
The Lorax (2012) - screenwriters, executive producers, and songwriter (Paul only)
Despicable Me 2 (2013) - screenwriters
The Secret Life of Pets (2016) - screenwriters
Weenie (2016) - directors and writers
Despicable Me 3 (2017) - screenwriters
Schmigadoon! (2021) - creators, writers, songwriter (Paul only), and executive producer (Paul only)

References

External links

American male screenwriters
Animation screenwriters
NBCUniversal people
Illumination (company) people
Screenwriting duos
Living people
American Latter Day Saints
USC School of Cinematic Arts alumni
Year of birth missing (living people)
Primetime Emmy Award winners